Young Life is an evangelical Christian organization based in Colorado Springs, Colorado which focuses on young people in middle school, high school, and college.

Week-long Summer camps are a major focus, and these have a definite evangelizing aspect. For example, there are large-group “Bible talks” once or twice daily often followed by small-group “cabin time” discussions.  And toward the end of the week, the young people are asked to go outside, be alone for 15 minutes, and attempt to talk with or commune with God.

Young Life estimates that a third of campers commit or re-commit their lives to Jesus and the Christian faith, with this estimate being based on “how many Bibles we gave out, how many kids went on new believer walk, and those who stood at ‘Say-So.’”

The organization was started in Gainesville, Texas in 1941 by Presbyterian minister Jim Rayburn. Young Life operates globally using several different organizations with different focuses. As of 2019, Young Life had chapters in 8,513 schools, with average weekly attendance at 369,600 across the organization. Young Life also has 67,000 volunteers as of 2019.

History
In 1941, Presbyterian seminary student Jim Rayburn started Young Life. He had been challenged to come up with ways to connect with and reach high school students who showed no interest in Christianity.  He began hosting a weekly club which featured one or two skits, as well as a simple message about Jesus.

The Young Life website credits the beginning to Clara Frasher, an elderly woman who around 1933 recruited friends to help her pray for teenagers attending Gainesville High School.  In 1939, Jim Rayburn who was a young seminarian started a chapter of the Miracle Book Club.  He also worked with local pastor Clyde Kennedy. The Young Life approach is to go where teenagers are and make friends with them, thereby earning “the right to be heard.” In the late 1940s at Wheaton College in Illinois, the organization developed its combination of using both paid staff and volunteers. “Campaigners” is a separate Young Life group for teenagers who have dedicated their lives to the Christian faith.

Also per Young Life’s website, they have had partnerships with Fuller Theological Seminary, as well as other seminaries.  Capernaum is Young Life’s ministry for young people with developmental disabilities.  Wyldlife is Young Life’s ministry for middle school students.

Camps

Numbers and locations 

Young Life maintains summer camps in 18 American states as well as camps in British Columbia, Canada, the Dominican Republic, Scotland, Armenia, and France. Overall, there are 26 camps, with 6 of these located outside the United States. These camps incorporate Christian messages presented in a camp setting along with typical camp activities.

The largest of Young Life's camps is the Washington Family Ranch (and accompanying Big Muddy Ranch Airport) in Antelope, Oregon. The ranch was formerly the site of an intentional community in the Rajneesh movement.

Regarding young people from the United States, in 2019, there were 93,000 Summer campers; in 2020, 15,000 Summer campers; and by the Spring of 2021, Young Life had received 61,000 requests for the upcoming 2021 Summer camping season (which is approximately two-thirds as much as 2019).

Evangelizing aspects 

A 2010 book stated, “Clubs became the vehicle to get high schoolers out of their own context and to a fabulous resort where they would have the best week of their lives and at the same time be presented with the Christian gospel.”

The Summer camps have a definite evangelizing or witnessing emphasis with large-group “Bible talk” once or twice a day often followed by small-group “cabin time” discussions.  For example, large group might involve 500 teenagers and small group might be 12 teenagers.  One night toward the end of the week, the young people are asked to “to go outside in silence, be alone for 15 minutes and try to talk to God.”

According to a 1994 Vancouver Sun newspaper article, out of 350 students attending one particular week-long session at the Malibu Camp in British Columbia, Canada, more than 100 publicly testified during the informal ceremony of “Commitment Night” on the final night saying they had committed their lives to Jesus.  According to the Malibu Camp manager about half of the teenagers end up committing or re-committing their lives either at camp or shortly thereafter.

One teenager said, “You’re treated like an adult. There’s a lot more freedom here than other Christian camps.”  But another said, “But I’m starting to feel a lot of pressure to become a Christian. I used to just sit there and agree with them, just to get them off my back. But now I’m ticked.”

Young Life states, “33% of all summer campers meet Jesus for the first time. (This is based on our own camp director reports as to how many Bibles we gave out, how many kids went on new believer walk, and those who stood at ‘Say-So.’)”

Controversies

Statement of Non-negotiables
In November 2007, Jeff McSwain, the Area Director of Durham and Chapel Hill, along with others, publicly took issue with the organization's presentation of the concept of sin. McSwain's theology emphasizes that “God has a covenant, marriage-like relationship with the world he has created, not a contract relationship that demands obedience prior to acceptance.” McSwain also said that he felt Young Life's 2007 “statement of non-negotiables” often ended up sounding “more Unitarian than Trinitarian by drawing a sharp contrast between the holy God and incarnated Son who ‘actually became sin.’” 

Tony Jones describes Young Life's Statement of “non-negotiables” as telling staffers that “they must not introduce the concept of Jesus and his grace until the students have been sufficiently convinced of their own depravity and been allowed to stew in that depravity (preferably overnight).” This has never been YoungLife's style.  Eight members of Young Life's teaching staff based in Durham, North Carolina resigned their positions after these “non-negotiables” were announced.

LGBTQ+ policy 
Young Life (USA) allows LGBTQ students to participate in Young Life activities, but does not allow them to volunteer or take leadership roles. In the organization's forms homosexuality is described as a “lifestyle” which is “clearly not in accord with God's creation purposes.” Conner Mertens, the first active college football player to come out as LGBTQ, was active in the group as a teenager, and planned to work with the group in college, but was not allowed due to his sexuality.

Young Life's policy also extends to LGBTQ allies. Local leader Pam Elliott stepped down after being asked to remove a photo from her Facebook page showing her support for the LGBTQ community.

Notable people
J.D. Gibbs – former president of Joe Gibbs Racing of NASCAR; volunteer leader throughout college and adulthood, longtime committee chairman for Young Life in Lake Norman.
Clint Gresham - former NFL long snapper. Volunteer leader in Seattle, Washington.
Brandon Heath – a contemporary Christian musician; attended Malibu Club as a high school student, became a leader in college and is still involved today.
Drew Holcomb and Ellie Holcomb – Americana and folk rock musicians; member of local committee in Nashville, Tennessee, summer camp musicians.
Marcus Johnson – American football wide receiver. Volunteer Young Life leader. Wore Young Life cleats for the NFL's cleats for a cause campaign.
Conner Mertens – first openly LGBT active college football player. Prohibited from volunteering by organization's policies.
Jordy Nelson – former NFL wide receiver; major donor for the organization's ministry in Green Bay, Wisconsin.
Stevie Nicks – American singer and songwriter with Fleetwood Mac.
Chase Rice – country music singer, reality television personality and college football player.
Aaron Rodgers – NFL quarterback for the Green Bay Packers; attended WoodLeaf Towne as a high school student, volunteered for the ministry in college.
Richard Russel - A Horizon Air ground agent who stole an Alaska Airlines Dash 8 airliner and crashed on Ketron Island in the Puget Sound, south of Seattle. 
James Dyson – Minister and teacher from Largo, Florida. Was Area Director of Ridgecrest, Florida Young Life, and Vice President of Young Life's Eastern Division.

References

External links

Evangelical parachurch organizations
Christian youth organizations
Religion in Colorado Springs, Colorado
Evangelicalism in Colorado
Organizations based in Colorado Springs, Colorado
Christian organizations established in 1941